Ogyris genoveva, the genoveva azure or southern purple azure, is a butterfly of the family Lycaenidae. It is found in Australia.

The wingspan is about 50 mm. Adult males are metallic purple, while females are black with metallic azure and a cream patch near the tip of each forewing.

The larvae feed on the foliage of various Loranthaceae species, including Amyema, Dendrophthoe and Muellerina species. They are flattened and brown with darker brown dots. The larvae live in the nest of Camponotus species. Pupation takes place inside this nest in a dark brown pupa of about 25 mm.

Subspecies
 Ogyris genoveva genoveva
 Ogyris genoveva duaringa Bethune-Baker, 1905 (Duaringa to Milmerran)
 Ogyris genoveva gela Waterhouse, 1941 (New South Wales)
 Ogyris genoveva araxes Waterhouse & Lyell, 1914 (north-western Victoria)
 Ogyris genoveva genua Waterhouse, 1941 (South Australia (Mount Lofty))
 Ogyris genoveva splendida Tindale, 1923 (South Australia (Flinders Ranges))

Gallery

References

Arhopalini
Butterflies of Australia
Butterflies described in 1853